Liar is the third album by Vancouver indie band Fake Shark – Real Zombie!. It was released on February 14, 2013. The album is a bit of direction change for the band, and the first with label, Light Organ Records. Guests include Care Failure of the band Die Mannequin, Jimmy Urine of Mindless Self Indulgence, Steve Bays of Hot Hot Heat, and Henry Rollins.

Track listing

Line-up
 Kevvy Mental - Vocals/synths/programming/guitar/bass guitar/drums
 Louis Wu - Guitar
 Tony Dallas - Bass guitar
 Jason Crawford - Drums

References

2013 albums
Fake Shark albums